Silvestre is a Spanish and Portuguese given name or surname, or a French surname. Notable people with the name include:

Surname
Cindy Silvestre (born 1993), French kickboxer 
Franck Silvestre (born 1967), retired French footballer
Israel Silvestre (1621–1691; called the Younger to distinguish him from his father), prolific French draftsman
José Plaridel Silvestre, writer and senior official of the Boy Scouts of the Philippines
Louis de Silvestre (1675–1760), French portrait and history painter, (son of Israel Silvestre)
Manuel Silvestre (born 1965), former Spanish water polo player
Matías Silvestre (born 1984), Argentine football (soccer) player
Mikaël Silvestre (born 1977), French football (soccer) player
Paul Armand Silvestre (1837–1901), French poet and conteur

Part of combined surname
Manuel Fernández Silvestre (1871–1921), Spanish military general
Antoine Isaac Silvestre de Sacy (1758–1838), French linguist and orientalist
Paulo Sérgio Silvestre do Nascimento (born 1969), former Brazilian footballer

Fictional
José Silvestre, character in H. Rider Haggard's adventure novel King Solomon's Mines (1885)

Given name
Silvestre S. Herrera
Silvestre Igoa
Silvestre Selva
Silvestre Pinheiro (born 1984), Portuguese football player
Silvestre Rasuk
Silvestre Reyes
Silvestre Dangond
Silvestre Vélez de Escalante
Silvestre Siale Bileka

See also
Silvestre, Rio de Janeiro, a neighborhood in Rio de Janeiro
Encina de San Silvestre
San Silvestre School
San Silvestre Vallecana

Spanish masculine given names
Portuguese masculine given names
Portuguese-language surnames
Spanish-language surnames
French-language surnames